The Valley Royals Track & Field Club is an athletics club based out of Abbotsford, British Columbia. Their uniforms are royal blue, red, and white, and their head coach is Trevor Wight and club advisor is the legendary Gerry Swan.  The club is based out of Jane & Gerry Swan Track at Rotary Stadium (so named in tribute to Coach Swan and his late wife), although they also have training groups in the Burnaby/Coquitlam area.

The Valley Royals are a member club of BC Athletics (British Columbia Athletics Association) and Athletics Canada.

History

The Abbotsford Royals (as they were originally named) were founded in 1980 by a group of parents who were unhappy with the direction of the Abbotsford Track Club; within five years, the original track club merged with the Royals. Initially a junior development organization, the Royals blossomed under the leadership of three founding members: Paul Anderson (their first president), Gerry Swan (their first and only head coach), and his wife Jane.

Shortly after Jane Swan's death in 2004, the city of Abbotsford renamed Rotary Stadium as "Jane & Gerry Swan Track at Rotary Stadium", in recognition of their contributions to the sport of athletics and the Abbotsford community as a whole. The following year, Jane was posthumously inducted to the BC Sports Hall of Fame.

Coaches

Current Valley Royals coaches:
Trevor Wight - Head Coach (Power & Speed)
Scott Svelander - Middle Distance Coach
Brit Townsend - Middle Distance Coach (Burnaby/Coquitlam)
Trevor Wight - Power/Speed Coach
Tom Dickson - Power/Speed Coach (Burnaby)
Sean LaForest - Throws Coach
Makaila LaPointe - Pole Vault Coach 
Scott Svelander - Junior Development Coach
Trevor Wight - Junior Development Coach

Olympians

Over the years, the Valley Royals have recruited several international-calibre athletes, and developed many children into great athletes. The following are lists of former and current Valley Royals (with Olympic years and events) who have competed at Olympic Games, many during their time as Valley Royals.

Former Valley Royals:
Jessica Smith - 2012 - 800m
Michael Mason - 2008 - high jump
Ruky Abdulai 2008 - long jump
Stephanie McCann - 2004 - pole vault
Royals & SFU coach Brit Townsend - 1984 - 1,500 m
Royals coach Harold Willers - 1984 - hammer throw (did not compete due to injury)
Leah Pells - 1992 - 3,000 m; 1996, 2000 - 1,500 m
Lynn Williams - 1984 - 3,000 m; 1988 - 1,500 m
Graeme Fell - 1988, 1992 - 3,000 m steeplechase
Greg Duhaime - 1984 - 3,000 m steeplechase

Other Noteworthy Athletes

Other athletes who have represented the Valley Royals on the international stage include:
Sarah Howell
Kevin Robinson
Angela Froese
Heather deGeest
Courtney Inman
Marty Cluff
Cari Rampersad
Jas Gill
Wes Boudreau
Matt Clifford
Corrina Wolf
Peter Cardle
Natalie Jackson
Meredith Macgregor
Julia Howard
Rebecca Johnstone
Rowan Hamilton
Vikramjit Singh Gondara

Events

The Valley Royals have hosted many prestigious events at Jane & Gerry Swan Track at Rotary Stadium since it was completed in 1986, including:
Pre Commonwealth Games Meet - 1994
Western Canada Summer Games - 1995
Harry Jerome International Track Classic - 1996
Canadian Senior Championships - 1997
NAIA National Championships - 1992, 1993, 2000, 2001
BC Disability Games - 2002
BC Summer Games - 2004
BC Seniors Games - 2006
Canadian 10,000 m Championships - 2006, 2007
Canadian Junior Championships - 1997, 2007, 2008
Abbotsford International Track Classic - every June since 2003 (as part of the PacifiCanada Series)
Countless BC Championships (for the Junior Development, Juvenile/Youth, Junior, Senior, and Master age groups)
BC Summer Games - 2016

References

External links 
 Valley Royals Track & Field Club

Abbotsford, British Columbia
Track and field clubs in Canada
1980 establishments in British Columbia